Thomas Bullitt (1730 – February 1778) was a United States military officer from Prince William County, Virginia and pioneer on its western frontier.

Early and family life
Thomas was born to Benjamin and Sarah (Harrison) Bullitt in 1730 in Prince William County, then in the Province of Virginia. Active in the local militia as a youth, he became interested in western exploration and development. By 1754 he was a captain in the county's militia, and participated in a number of attempts to secure western Virginia and Pennsylvania from the French. His younger brother Cuthbert Bullitt studied to become an attorney, became a planter in Prince William County and represented it in the Virginia House of Delegates, mostly after this man's death.

French and Indian War
Captain Bullitt and part of his militia company joined Colonel Washington's expedition in 1754 that ended with defeat in the Battle of Great Meadows. The  next year Captain Bullitt and his men again marched against Fort Duquesne, this time with the Braddock Expedition, and again failed, at the Battle of Monogahela on July 9, 1755.

The third try in 1758 also started badly, but ended victoriously. Bullitt led a militia company in the Forbes Expedition. In September he was part of the large advance party of regulars and militia commanded by Major James Grant. After Grant refused advice on wilderness fighting, his party was ambushed by the French and their Indian allies on September 21, 1758. They took heavy losses and Grant was captured. Bullitt took to the woods, but rallied the militia, and counterattacked their pursuers. He then led more than half of the original party back to their main force. The French were forced to abandon the fort in November.

On May 22, 1759, French and Indian troops defeated a party of 100 Virginians under the command of Captain Thomas Bullitt on the Forbes Road near Fort Ligonier. Bullitt and his troops were taking provisions from Bedford to Fort Ligonier when they were attacked. They suffered over 40 casualties and lost many of their supplies.  William Byrd published in Hunter's Virginia Gazette (Williamsburg) a letter dated 26 Oct 1759 and sent from Pittsburgh in which he stated that Gen. John Stanwix at Byrd's request convened a court of inquiry to investigate Captain Bullitt's conduct. The court decided unanimously 'that Captain Bullitt behaved like a good Officer, and did every Thing in his Power to repulse the Enemy, and save the Convoy.'"

After the war
Bullitt kept his interest in the frontier. He began to speculate in land and invest in development. When a number of his militia company exercised their land grant bounties in what would become Bath County, Virginia, he bought land there and built an Inn at Hot Springs in 1766. Over the next few years his guests included Thomas Jefferson and George Washington.

During the war, Andrew Lewis and Thomas Bullitt had surveyed part of the area and had heard stories from the Native Americans and colonists about the healing powers of the springs. In 1764, Captain Thomas Bullitt received a colonial land grant of 300 acres which contained seven hot and warm springs. "After receiving the award, Captain Bullitt moved his militia company and their families to the area. The land was cleared, and within two years, a wooden 18 room wooden hotel was constructed there, and in 1766 the "Homestead" was opened and named in honor of the homesteaders who built the resort and bathhouses." The Omni Homestead Resort, as it is called today, continued to be operated by Thomas Bullitt's family after his death during the Revolution, until 1832, when it was sold to Dr. Thomas Goode (physician), who also purchased the Healing Springs, Virginia and the resort at Warm Springs, Virginia.

He also continued his militia service, and at the war's end in 1763 he became adjutant general of the state militia, a post that he held through the early days of the Revolutionary War.

Surveying Kentucky
By 1773, Virginia was still searching for land to satisfy grants and bounties, and was still struggling with the details of the Proclamation of 1763. Settlers were pushing west into Kentucky, even without colonial authorization or control. In an effort to bring some order to the situation,  Governor Dunmore, authorized Captain Bullitt to organize a party to survey northern and eastern Kentucky.

Bullitt gathered about 40 men and set out from the Kanawha River Valley and generally followed the along the south side of the Valley of the Ohio.  He made some excursions from his direct path, going as far north as Chillicothe to speak with Chief Cornstalk of the Shawnee. By July his party had reached the Falls of the Ohio, and Bullitt laid out a town site there that later became Louisville, Kentucky.

Bullitt and his men tried to maintain peaceful relations with the Indians, but did lose one work party in an attack. The incursion was also one of the Indian complaints that caused Lord Dunmore's War the following year. As a reward for his service on this expedition and in the French and Indian War, Bullitt was granted  in the newly surveyed territory. He chose a site he believed best for early development, in what is today downtown Charleston, West Virginia.

The Revolutionary War
Bullitt still held the post of Adjutant General for the Virginia militia. As the Revolution became imminent his sympathies lay firmly in the rebel cause. When Governor Dunmore made his last stand in 1775, Captain Bullitt was a part of the forces that assembled for the Battle of Great Bridge. He took charge of engineering works for Colonel William Woodford who had overall command. His rapidly constructed defenses aided in the overwhelming American victory on December 9, 1775. Dunmore fell back into Norfolk, but was forced to abandon that as well when Bullitt began the construction of siege trenches and works. By the end of December, Virginia had no British forces on her land, and Bullitt was promoted to Colonel.

Thomas Bullitt was elected several times to the House of Delegates (legislature) of the newly formed Virginia government. But he did not usually attend their meetings. He made an exception in November and December 1777 to help George Rogers Clark promote his plans for a western campaign. The delegates made Clark a Lieutenant Colonel and authorized him to defend the western frontiers. A second, and secret, set of orders allowed him to invade the Illinois Country. These were known only to Bullitt, Patrick Henry, Thomas Jefferson, George Mason and George Wythe.

Death and will

Bullitt died at his home in Fauquier County, Virginia, in February, 1778, at the comparatively early age of forty-eight years. His will, dated September 17, 1775, was probated February 23, 1778 (Will Book I, p. 321, Fauquier County). In his will, he left 400 acres and an annual allowance for support to his illegitimate daughter, Sarah Elizabeth Brounaunt, or Bronaugh, and most of the balance of his estate to his brother, Judge Cuthbert Bullitt.

Further reading

References

1734 births
1782 deaths
American surveyors
American explorers
Kentucky pioneers
People of Kentucky in the American Revolution
People of Virginia in the French and Indian War
History of Louisville, Kentucky
Virginia colonial people
Virginia militiamen in the American Revolution
Thomas
People from Warm Springs, Virginia